Imran Sarker is a Bangladeshi cricketer. He made his List A debut for Victoria Sporting Club in the 2016–17 Dhaka Premier Division Cricket League on 11 May 2017.

References

External links
 

Year of birth missing (living people)
Living people
Bangladeshi cricketers
Victoria Sporting Club cricketers
Place of birth missing (living people)